Duboisvalia ecuadoria is a moth in the Castniidae family. It is found in Ecuador, Colombia, Peru and Bolivia.

Subspecies
Duboisvalia ecuadoria ecuadoria (Ecuador)
Duboisvalia ecuadoria albicornis (Houlbert, 1917) (Peru)
Duboisvalia ecuadoria cratina (Westwood, 1877)
Duboisvalia ecuadoria melanolimbata (Strand, 1913) (Peru)
Duboisvalia ecuadoria pellonia (Druce, 1890) (Ecuador)
Duboisvalia ecuadoria plethoneura (Bryk, 1930) (Ecuador)
Duboisvalia ecuadoria strandi (Niepelt, 1914) (Bolivia)
Duboisvalia ecuadoria truxilla (Westwood, 1877) (Colombia)

References

Moths described in 1877
Castniidae